The Dr. Charles Cotton House is an historic house at 5 Cotton Court in Newport, Rhode Island.  It is one of the city's oldest houses.

It is a -story wood-frame structure, five bays wide, with a large central chimney and a hipped roof.  The original portion of the house was built around 1720 with large Georgian style additions in the 18th century and modifications in the nineteenth century.

Dr. Charles Cotton, a great-grandson of Josiah Cotton and surgeon aboard the USS Constitution, owned the house in the early 19th century and gave the house its current name. The Cotton House was taken by eminent domain by the Newport Restoration Foundation in 1974 from the Cotton family who owned the house for 157 years.  The Foundation moved the house in 1977 from its original location across the adjoining parking lot.  The house was restored from 1979 to 1980. The site added to the National Register of Historic Places in 1979.

See also
National Register of Historic Places listings in Newport County, Rhode Island

References and external links
Newport Restoration Foundation information

Houses on the National Register of Historic Places in Rhode Island
Houses in Newport, Rhode Island
National Register of Historic Places in Newport, Rhode Island
Historic district contributing properties in Rhode Island